Stracke is a German surname.

Notable people 

Notable people with the surname Stracke include:
 Gustav Stracke (1887–1943), German astronomer — (de)
 Karl-Friedrich Stracke (born 1956), German engineer
 Stephan Stracke (born 1974), German politician
 Win Stracke (1908–1991), American musician

See also 
 1019 Strackea, asteroid named after Gustav Stracke

Surnames from nicknames